Ce'na, better known by her alias Vette, is a fictional character in BioWare's massively multiplayer online role-playing game Star Wars: The Old Republic. The starting companion for players who select the Sith Warrior class, Vette is a Twi'lek, a humanoid species within the Star Warss universe known for the twin tentacular appendages that protrude from the back of their heads. As the player character's slave, Vette comes with a shock collar that the player may either remove, or utilize to torture her. She is voiced by Catherine Taber. 

Vette's character has received a mixed response. While she is popular with players and her characterization is generally well received, the moral implications of the player character abusing her via the shock collar has been met with criticism and controversy.

Concept and design

Vette is developed as a selectable companion character from the player's pool of allies in The Old Republic. Companions are fully-functional characters directed by artificial intelligence, who are capable of fighting by the player's side through much of the single player content for The Old Republic, and joining multiplayer parties to fill in for other players who have to take their leave mid-session when necessary. Vette may also be instructed to craft items as a companion. Her appearance can be customised by the player, a feature intended to help make each player's companions feel unique despite the MMO nature of The Old Republic. Prior to The Old Republic update 4.0 patch released on October 20, 2015, the nature of Vette's relationship with the player character was measured numerically as "Affection" and could be altered depending on whatever decisions are made; this mechanic has since been replaced with "Influence", which also builds when a player makes meaningful decisions with companions but is not a determinant as to whether they like the player character or not.

Catherine Taber, a self-described Star Wars fan, voices Vette. She was offered the role without being required to go through an audition. Taber and BioWare had a clear vision on what Vette would be, and wanted to use her to infuse the game with traditional Star Wars humour. Taber drew on parts of Indiana Jones while voicing the character—at one point improvising the line "K'lor'slugs, why did it have to be k'lor'slugs?" in reference to the character.

Appearances
Vette is introduced near the start of the Sith Warrior storyline, having been captured by the Sith after an attempt to break into an ancient tomb. The Warrior is given her as a slave, wearing a shock collar, to help them access a secret entrance to the tomb, as part of their trials. It is at this point she becomes a companion, and afterwards, the Warrior's master, Baras, allows the Warrior to keep her. The player may choose to free her or keep her as their slave, the latter of which allows opportunities to shock her at various points in the story. As they increase in character levels, the player character has further conversations with Vette where they learn about her backstory. Additionally, throughout the game, Vette may comment on the player's choices, and the tone she adopts is dependent on the nature of her relationship with the player character. In the character's questline, the Warrior meets a group of Twi'leks she used to be part of and helps her track down her family: Vette finds her sister, though her mother is already dead, to which the Warrior may either encourage Vette to let it go or to try and take vengeance. If the player chooses a male Sith Warrior, Vette may, over the course of the game, develop a romance with the character.

Reception
Critical reception for Vette has been mixed, though the character is generally popular with The Old Republic players. A 2012 fan poll by IGN placed Vette as the fourth favourite of all Old Republic companions. According to player infographics released by BioWare in celebration of The Old Republics fifth anniversary, Vette along with Lana Beniko were the most recruited companions as of July 2016. 

Larry Everett from Massively Overpowered claimed that Vette is "almost universally liked" by players, singling out her quirky personality, sense of adventure, and the quality of Taber's performance for praise. He also suggested that Vette's popularity may be connected to nostalgia, as Taber's earlier character from Knights of the Old Republic Mission Vao was another fan favorite. The dynamic nature of Vette's character arc is cited by Robin Burks of Tech Times as a demonstration that romance subplots in The Old Republic are not mere distractions from the overarching story, but are integrated into the main narrative and help shape who and what the player character becomes by the end of the game.  Rolando Gutierrez from Gamers Decide assessed Vette to be overall the best companion and romance option for the Sith Warrior based on multiple criteria, including her personality, gameplay utility, and the quality of her romance subplot. GameZone's Andrew Clouther used Vette as an example of how The Old Republic s dark side oriented character arcs not only "tempts you with evil, but tests your ability to DO evil", and praised the game for its ability to affect players and challenge their consciences. Kotaku's Phil Owen drew attention to one scene where the player may have sex with a woman and forbid Vette to leave. While he acknowledged that this act is "messed up", Owen commented that BioWare allowing players to act evil is a big reason why he holds the game in high regard.

Conversely, Erik Kain from Forbes was critical of the inclusion of a shock-collar-wearing slave as a companion character, which according to him was "not so much surprising as it is disappointing" and "really creepy". Kain argued that this is symptomatic of how gaming is "overly focused on teenage boys" and reinforces a hostile, misogynistic environment for girls, and that the inclusion of choice failed to improve upon the situation. The Mary Sue contributor Becky Chambers felt that in theory Vette's character concept was fine, and that within a gender equitable  Star Wars universe created by BioWare her gender could be "entirely incidental". However, Chambers was unconvinced that very few players could play without involving their "personal context" and considered it a problem in the context of the wider gaming community. She expressed discomfort about all available options for the player character in dealing with Vette, and criticized BioWare for inadvertently encouraging misogynistic behaviour with their shortsighted creative decisions.

Daily Mail allegations
The Daily Mail ran an article based on a story by Mike Fahey from Kotaku on their Mail Online website with the following headline: "Hit Star Wars game lets players 'own' and torment female slaves with electric shock collar". In Fahey's original article which was written in a sarcastic tone, he described his exploration of the other option available to the player as a Sith Warrior character, after choosing to remove the shock collar the first time around. He eventually formed the view that he found no "perverse pleasure" in developing an abusive relationship between his character and Vette and that he could not remember a single video game experience that made him feel quite as "dirty and evil". Quoting Fahey's observations about general chat comments of players boasting about their torture of Vette and her low Affection rating, Rob Waugh from The Daily Mail alleged that the option to treat Vette decently is not popular and that players are encouraged to indulge in the simulated torture of female characters. While noting that Star Wars was "no stranger to slavery", Waugh remarked that "the idea of playing 'master' yourself is unsavoury" and suggested this as evidence of declining morals in video games. 

MCV writer Ben Parfitt and Jim Sterling from Destructoid both criticized the Daily Mail for the lack of evidence behind its sensationalist assertions. Andy Robinson of Computer and Video Games echoed the criticism of their lack of evidence, as well as noting their omission that female player characters are equally able to shock Vette and a hypocrisy displayed by the paper's other sexually-oriented articles.

Analysis by Religion Dispatches
Robert M. Geraci and Nat Recine surveyed 369 The Old Republic players on behalf of Religion Dispatches to inquire about how they handled Vette as their character's slave. Geraci and Recine stated that their motivation for conducting the survey was because neither the Daily Mail nor the various responses to the former's provocative article "asked what players actually do in the game, or what they really believe". The survey's findings suggested that most players revealed their discomfort with evil acts, predominantly chose benevolent options and resisted behaving in a cruel manner to a fictional individual, with 84% of respondents befriending and showing mercy to Vette instead of torturing her. It also suggested that the presence of characters like Vette influenced the player's actions and encouraged them to make choices that would gain them "Affection". Geraci and Recine noted that "torturing Vette makes sense — if one plays as a Sith Warrior", as such characters are evil-aligned and "seemingly destined to cruelty". Geraci and Recine also found that those who did torture characters within the game claimed that role-play gave them an opportunity to consider moral questions, in essence envisioning a "more just world even while exploring the darker side of human nature". They determined that like most other MMO video games, The Old Republic "carries a quasi-religious affect and can be part of modern moral development"; that the game's "on-the-ground experience" is often morally progressive which "undermines claims about the supposed evils of online gaming"; and a player who is capable of committing a criminal act in a videogame does not mean they would do so in real life. In summary, they formed a view that while it is reasonable to question games that "railroad players down morally questionable paths", patience and consideration should be exercised when assessing allegations of video games teaching or encouraging morally objectionable behavior, and suggested that "the truth might be quite the opposite". They concluded, based on their research data, that The Old Republic is not turning players evil, but "may be teaching them what it means to be good".

References

External links
Vette's biography on the Official Website of Star Wars: The Old Republic

BioWare characters
Star Wars: Knights of the Old Republic characters
Extraterrestrial characters in video games
Female characters in video games
Fictional assassins in video games
Fictional female assassins
Fictional female pirates
Fictional female criminals
Fictional criminals in video games
Fictional slaves
Space pirates
Star Wars Legends characters
Video game characters introduced in 2011
Video game sidekicks